Burtsevo is a rural locality (a village) in Russko-Yurmashsky Selsoviet, Ufimsky District, Bashkortostan, Russia. The population was 217 as of 2010. There are 18 streets.

Geography 
Burtsevo is located 22 km southeast of Ufa (the district's administrative centre) by road. Shmidtovo is the nearest rural locality.

References 

Rural localities in Ufimsky District